The SCR-602 (Set Complete Radio model 602) also known as the AN/TPS-3, was a mobile, lightweight, medium-range, early-warning radar utilized by the United States and its allies during World War II.  The radar was originally designed for use during the initial stages of an amphibious assault or military operation where its lightweight relative to other radar systems was a distinct advantage.  Once larger radars such as the SCR-270 or AN/TPS-1 came online the SCR-602 could also be used to fill in gaps in radar coverage.  

Numerous variations of the SCR-602 were manufactured during the war.  It was utilized by the United States, United Kingdom and Australia.

Developing the radar 
Development of the SCR-602 began in 1942 at the behest of Colonel Gordon P. Saville of the United States Army Air Corps.  With delays to the manufacture and fielding of both the SCR-588 and SCR-527, the Air Corps was quickly seeking another radar for ground-controlled interception.  This new radar was an adaptation of the United Kingdom's Chain Home Low radar.  The Signal Corps was asked to develop a lightweight assault-type radar that could be both air transportable and hand-carried as well as have a range of over 100 miles on enemy bombardment aircraft. Prior to this request, the Air Force relied on the British lightweight warning (LW) radar, which the Signal Corps studied for ideas.  After testing the VT-158 in various existing sets such as the SCR-268, a team led by Captain John Marchetti incorporated the VT-158 in a new system designated as the SCR-602. The original SCR-602, known as SCR-602-T1 for “Type 1”, was almost an exact copy of the British LW radar. With the implementation of the VT-158, Marchetti's team developed the SCR-602-T8 (Type 8), which was based on a modified SCR-268 used in the Canal Zone. In order to prove that the newly developed SCR-602-T8 was air transportable, the Signal Corps flew the first laboratory model in a Douglas B-18 Bolo from Newark Airport to a test site in Orlando, Florida on February 27, 1943. Upon arriving at its destination, the SCR-602-T8 was set up and calibrated for testing. At the end of the tests, the engineers determined that the model had a range in excess of 110 miles and could be mass-produced.

The SCR-602-T8, which was designated as the AN/TPS-3, soon became the most successful variant of the SCR-602 model. Consisting of a 10-ft parabolic reflector antenna with a horizontal polarized dipole radiator at its focus and a console with an A-scope and a PPI-scope, the AN/TPS-3 became widely used by Army and Marine forces for early warning at beachheads, isolated areas, and captured air bases. Furthermore, the AN/TPS-3 could be assembled and put on the air by a crew of four men in thirty minutes, making it easy to deploy. Many Japanese kamikaze aircraft attacks were reportedly foiled by this radar. By 1944, 900 sets of the SCR-602-T8 were manufactured by Zenith Radio Corporation, and the accompanying VT-158's were produced by Eitel-McCullough, Inc., a manufacturer of high-frequency transmitting tubes located near San Francisco. However, the exact number of VT-158's produced throughout the war remains unknown.

Technical description 
The radar utilized the BC-800-B IFF receiver/transponder.

Operational history 
The SCR-602 was developed in time to be utilized by the U.S. Army during the invasion of North Africa in November 1942.

See also 
 Signal Corps Radio
 List of U.S. Signal Corps Vehicles

Citation

References

Bibliography

Journal

Web
 SCR-602 radar description

Technical Manuals
 TM 11-1126 - Radio Sets SCR-602-A and SCR-602-T6 - War Department - September 1943
 TM 11-1326 - Radio Sets SCR-602-T6 and 602A Technical Operation - War Department - May 1944
 TM 11-1426 - Preventive Maintenance Radio Sets SCR-602A and SCR-602-T6 - War Department - June 1944
 TM 11-1526 - Service Manual For Radio Sets SCR-602 - War Department - July 1944.

External links 
 Information on British Chain Home World War II radar
 U.S. Radar, Operational Characteristics of Radar, Classified by Tactical Application, FTP 217
 National Electronics Museum

Military radars of the United States
World War II radars
World War II American electronics
SCR602
Ground radars
United States Marine Corps equipment
Military equipment introduced from 1940 to 1944